Alone at My Wedding is a 2018 Belgian drama film written and directed by Marta Bergman, starring Alina Serban and Tom Vermeir. The film had its world premiere at the 2018 Cannes Film Festival. At the 10th Magritte Awards, Alone at My Wedding received three nominations, including Best Film, winning Best Costume Design for Claudine Tychon.

Accolades

References

External links
 

2018 films
2018 drama films
Belgian drama films
2010s French-language films
2010s Dutch-language films
2010s Romanian-language films
2018 multilingual films
Belgian multilingual films